Lamium orvala, known as balm-leaved archangel, is a species of flowering plant in the family Lamiaceae, native to central eastern Europe (Austria, Italy, Hungary, Former Yugoslavia, Ukraine, Moldova).

References 

orvala
Plants described in 1759
Flora of Europe
Taxa named by Carl Linnaeus